In abstract algebra, a partially ordered ring is a ring (A, +, ·), together with a compatible partial order, that is, a partial order  on the underlying set A that is compatible with the ring operations in the sense that it satisfies:

and

for all . Various extensions of this definition exist that constrain the ring, the partial order, or both. For example, an Archimedean partially ordered ring is a partially ordered ring  where  partially ordered additive group is Archimedean.

An ordered ring, also called a totally ordered ring, is a partially ordered ring  where  is additionally a total order.

An l-ring, or lattice-ordered ring, is a partially ordered ring  where  is additionally a lattice order.

Properties 
The additive group of a partially ordered ring is always a partially ordered group.

The set of non-negative elements of a partially ordered ring (the set of elements  for which  also called the positive cone of the ring) is closed under addition and multiplication, that is, if  is the set of non-negative elements of a partially ordered ring, then  and  Furthermore, 

The mapping of the compatible partial order on a ring  to the set of its non-negative elements is one-to-one; that is, the compatible partial order uniquely determines the set of non-negative elements, and a set of elements uniquely determines the compatible partial order if one exists.

If  is a subset of a ring  and:
 
 
 
 

For any  and 

holds.

f-rings 
For example, Birkhoff and Pierce demonstrated an l-ring with 1 in which 1 is not positive, even though it is a square. The additional hypothesis required of f-rings eliminates this possibility.

Example 

From an algebraic point of view the rings 
are fairly rigid. For example, localisations, residue rings or limits of rings of the form  are not of this form in general. A much more flexible class of f-rings containing all rings of continuous functions and resembling many of the properties of these rings is the class of real closed rings.

Properties 
 A direct product of f-rings is an f-ring, an l-subring of an f-ring is an f-ring, and an l-homomorphic image of an f-ring is an f-ring.

  in an f-ring.

 The category Arf consists of the Archimedean f-rings with 1 and the l-homomorphisms that preserve the identity.

 Every ordered ring is an f-ring, so every sub-direct union of ordered rings is also an f-ring. Assuming the axiom of choice, a theorem of Birkhoff shows the converse, and that an l-ring is an f-ring if and only if it is l-isomorphic to a sub-direct union of ordered rings. Some mathematicians take this to be the definition of an f-ring.

Formally verified results for commutative ordered rings 
IsarMathLib, a library for the Isabelle theorem prover, has formal verifications of a few fundamental results on commutative ordered rings. The results are proved in the ring1 context.

Suppose  is a commutative ordered ring, and  Then:

See also

References

Further reading 

 
 Gillman, Leonard; Jerison, Meyer Rings of continuous functions. Reprint of the 1960 edition. Graduate Texts in Mathematics, No. 43. Springer-Verlag, New York-Heidelberg, 1976. xiii+300 pp

External links 

 
 

Ring theory
Ordered algebraic structures